Test Tube Babies, also known as Blessed Are They (American reissue title), Sins of Love (American reissue title) and The Pill (America reissue title, recut version), is a 1948 exploitation film directed by W. Merle Connell and produced by George Weiss. It is a narrative about artificial insemination with scenes of nudity and sexual promiscuity included. One scene shows the male lead character's sperm viewed through a microscope.

Plot

A young married couple find themselves drifting apart. Wife Cathy Bennet (Dorothy Duke) finds temporary pleasure at swinging parties or in the arms of another man, Frank Grover (John Michael). Husband George Bennet (William Thomason) confronts his wife about the widening chasm between them; she tells him she feels they are somehow incomplete without children. She undergoes testing to see why she hasn't conceived. George, who has accompanied her, is asked to also undergo testing and is found to be the problem: he is sterile. Physician Dr. Wright (Timothy Farrell) suggests artificial insemination using a sperm donor. This proves successful and the Bennetts begin a new and happy phase of their marriage.

Cast

Dorothy Duke as Cathy Bennett
William Thomason as George Bennett
Timothy Farrell as Dr. Wright
John Michael as Frank Grover
Margaret Roach (here as Peggy Roach) as Cathy's mother
Stacey Alexander as Don Williams
Georgie Barton as Betty Williams
Mary Lou Reckow as Dolores LaFleur
Bebe Berto as Jerry
Guy Gordon as Phil
Helen Cogan as Grace
Gine Franklin as Ralph
Zona Siggins as Nurse Mason

See also
 List of films in the public domain in the United States

References

 
 
 test tube baby procedure

American black-and-white films
1948 drama films
1940s exploitation films
1948 films
American drama films
1940s educational films
1940s English-language films
1940s American films
American educational films